Dwaar Kill, Dwaarkill or Dwars Kill may refer to:

In New Jersey:
Dwars Kill, a tributary of the Hackensack River (Oradell Reservoir) 

In New York:
Dwaar Kill (Shawangunk Kill), a tributary of the Shawangunk Kill 
Dwaar Kill (Wallkill River), a tributary of the Wallkill River 
Dwaarkill, New York, a hamlet in the town of Shawangunk